Strážek is a market town in Žďár nad Sázavou District in the Vysočina Region of the Czech Republic. It has about 800 inhabitants.

Administrative parts
Villages of Jemnice, Krčma, Meziboří, Mitrov and Moravecké Janovice are administrative parts of Strážek.

References

Populated places in Žďár nad Sázavou District
Market towns in the Czech Republic